The War Hound and the World's Pain is a 1981 fantasy novel by English writer Michael Moorcock, the first of the "von Bek" series of novels.

Plot summary
The book is set in Europe ravaged by the Thirty Years' War. Its hero Ulrich von Bek is a mercenary and freethinker, who finds himself a damned soul in a castle owned by Lucifer. Much to his surprise, von Bek is charged by Lucifer with doing God's work, by finding the Holy Grail, the "cure for the world's pain", that will also cure Lucifer's pain by reconciling him with God. Only through doing this can von Bek save his soul.

After many adventures, von Bek eventually finds the Holy Grail, and discovers that it will set mankind on the path to self-redemption through rationality, without the help of God or the hindrance of Lucifer.

The story is continued in The City in the Autumn Stars (1986).

Reception
Dave Pringle reviewed The War Hound and the World's Pain for Imagine magazine: "I am pleased to report that it makes a delightful read. Although minor, it is much superior to the earlier quickies in, say, the 'Dorian Hawkmoon' series, Moorcock has honed his skills over the years, and they now show a fine gleaming edge".

Reviews
Review by Jeff Frane (1981) in Locus, #250 November 1981
Review by Charles Platt (1982) in The Patchin Review, Number Three
Review by Darrell Schweitzer (1982) in Science Fiction Review, Spring 1982
Review by Mary Gentle (1982) in Vector 106
Review by Joan Gordon (1982) in Science Fiction & Fantasy Book Review, #2, March 1982
Review by Debbie Notkin (1982) in Rigel Science Fiction, #4 Spring 1982
Review by Baird Searles (1982) in Isaac Asimov's Science Fiction Magazine, May 1982
Review by Thomas A. Easton [as by Tom Easton] (1982) in Analog Science Fiction/Science Fact, June 1982
Review by Tom Staicar (1982) in Amazing Science Fiction Stories, June 1982
Review by Roger C. Schlobin (1982) in Fantasy Newsletter, #49 July 1982
Review by Joe Sanders (1982) in Starship, November 1982
Review [French] by Isabelle Barbé (1984) in SFère, #12
Review [French] by Stéphane Nicot? (1984) in Fiction, #349
Review [French] by Jean-Pierre Andrevon (1984) in Fiction, #349
Review [French] by André-François Ruaud? (1985) in Proxima [France], #8
Review [French] by Jean-Yves Besnard (1986) in Fiction, #371
Review by David Pringle (1988) in Modern Fantasy: The Hundred Best Novels
Review by Bruce Gillespie (1989) in SF Commentary, #67
Review [French] by Pascal Godbillon (1994) in Yellow Submarine, #107

References

1981 British novels
English fantasy novels
Novels by Michael Moorcock
1981 fantasy novels
Fiction about the Devil

fr:Chien de guerre